Waterloo is a city in Jefferson County in the U.S. state of Wisconsin. As of the census of 2020, the population was 3,483.
The name Waterloo was suggested by Mr. Wilt, a Frenchman living here, who was one of Napoleon's soldiers, at the battle of Waterloo. Waterloo is located in the Watertown-Fort Atkinson micropolitan area which is a sub-market of the larger Milwaukee-Racine-Waukesha CSA.

Geography

Demographics

As of 2000, the median income for a household in the city was $50,221, and the median income for a family was $56,446. The per capita income for the city was $23,011. About 5.0% of families and 4.8% of the population were below the poverty line, including 5.8% of those under age 18 and 7.1% of those age 65 or over.

2010 census
As of the census of 2010, there were 3,333 people, 1,331 households, and 867 families residing in the city. The population density was 854.6 people per square mile (330/km2). There were 1,409 housing units at an average density of 361.3 per square mile (139.5/km2). The racial makeup of the city was 89.20% White, 0.80% Black or African American, 0.40% Native American, 0.80% Asian, 9.40% from other races, and 1.20% from two or more races. 12.80% of the population were Hispanic or Latino of any race.

There were 1,331 households, of which 32.8% had children under the age of 18 living with them, 51.4% were married couples living together, 9.2% had a female householder with no husband present, and 34.9% were non-families. 29.2% of all households were made up of individuals, and 23.1% had someone living alone who was 65 years of age or older. The average household size was 2.49 and the average family size was 3.09.

In the city, the population was spread out, with 26.1% under the age of 18, 5.6% from 18 to 24, 27.9% from 25 to 44, 26.6% from 45 to 64, and 12.0% who were 65 years of age or older. The median age was 37.5 years. For every 100 females, there were 100 males. For every 100 females age 18 and over, there were 95.7 males.

Economy
The city is the headquarters for Trek Bicycle Corporation and Van Holten Pickles. Waterloo was formerly the headquarters of Perry Printing, later Perry-Judd.

Media
Waterloo is the home of its own weekly newspaper named The Courier. Waterloo is a part of the Milwaukee television market with Madison based stations also available over the air and on cable. Waterloo is served by radio stations from the Milwaukee, Madison and Janesville markets.

Annual events
 Wiener and Kraut Day
 Fireman's Park 4th of July 
 Christmas Holiday Parade

Notable people
 Arnie F. Betts, Wisconsin State Representative
 Tom Hamilton, broadcaster of the Cleveland Guardians
 Daniel L. Hannifin, Wisconsin State Representative
 Everis A. Hayes, congressman from California

Gallery of images

References

External links
 City of Waterloo
 Sanborn fire insurance maps: 1894 1899 1904 1912
 Island (St. Wenceslaus) Church - Town of Waterloo-Wisconsin history (1988) 

Cities in Wisconsin
Cities in Jefferson County, Wisconsin